Dean Boylan (born January 28, 1951) is an American former professional ice hockey defenseman.

During the 1973–74 and 1974–75 seasons, Boylan played 64 games in the World Hockey Association with the New York Golden Blades, Jersey Knights, and San Diego Mariners.

References

External links

1951 births
Living people
American men's ice hockey defensemen
Jersey Knights players
New York Golden Blades players
Philadelphia Firebirds (NAHL) players
Richmond Robins players
San Diego Mariners players
Syracuse Blazers players
Yale Bulldogs men's ice hockey players
Ice hockey people from Boston